The Bishop of Derby was a suffragan bishop of the Church of England Diocese of Southwell in the Province of Canterbury.

The title was first created as a suffragan see within the Diocese of Southwell. The suffragan Bishop of Derby assisted the diocesan Bishop of Southwell in overseeing the diocese.

List of bishops

References

 
Derby suffragan